The Williston Formation is a geologic formation in Florida. It preserves fossils dating back to the Paleogene period.

See also

 List of fossiliferous stratigraphic units in Florida

References
 

Paleogene Florida
Williston, Florida